National Institutes of Health Director's New Innovator Award is a research initiative first announced in 2007 designed to supports exceptionally creative, early-career investigators who propose innovative, high-impact projects. The focus is specifically on "innovative" research that  has a potential to produce paradigm shifting results. The Award is for $300,000 (direct cost) per year for five years.

The NIH Director's New Innovator Award has one of the lowest "success rates" of all NIH funding mechanism. In 2014 only the National Institutes of Health Director's Pioneer Award had a lower "success rate."  During the evaluation process each New Innovator application is reviewed and scored independently by three external reviewers. NIA program leadership then rank the applications by averaging the Overall Scores, and the highest scored applications are considered finalists. The finalist applications are then scored by a second set of reviewers, and are ranked once more by program leadership using the second set of scores. The final ranking is then sent to the NIH Director as a recommendation for funding.

Notable awardees
Pardis Sabeti

Other recipients
Murat Acar
Erez Lieberman Aiden
Michael Beyeler
Parijat Bhatnagar
Alistair Boettiger
Gemma Carvill
Michelle M. Chan
Jerry Chen
Sidi Chen
Nicolas Chevrier
Eun Ji Chung
Brian Cobb
Bianxiao Cui
Subhamoy Dasgupta
Megan Dennis
Fangyuan Ding
Zoe Donaldson
Sergei Doulatov
Rachel Dutton
Katherine Ehrlich
Luisa Escobar-Hoyos
Alison Feder
Evan Feinberg
Fleur M. Ferguson
Yvette Fisher
Stephen Floor
Kendra Frederick
Akhilesh K. Gaharwar
Daniel Gallego-Perez
Charles Gawad
Luke Gilbert
Aaron Gitler
Yiyang Gong
Reyna Gordon
Thomas Guerrero
Junjie Guo
Rizal Hariadi
Jun Huang
Rajan Jain
Matthew Kayser
Justin Kim
Kevin King
Ester Kwon
Dan Landau
Shixin Liu
Po-Ru Loh
Lara Mahal
Emanual Maverakis
Carolyn McBride
Prashand Mishra
Michael Mitchell
Darcie Moore
Medha Pathak
Priya Rajasethupathy
Srivatsam Raman
Jeremy Rock
Kole Roybal
Warren Ruder
Nasia Safdar
Manish Saggar
Tiffany Scharschmidt
Mark Sheffield
James Shorter
Nikolai Slavov
Ellen Sletten
Sabrina Spencer
Nicholas Stephanopoulos
Michael Tadross
Luke Theogarajan
Denis Titov
Raju Tomer
Carlos Ernesto Vargas-Irwin
Shigeki Watanabe
Leor Weinberger
Amy Wesolowski
Kathryn Whitehead
Erik Wright
Sean Wu
Ke Xu
Naoki Yamanaka
Sarah Zanders
Yongxin (Leon) Zhao
Haining Zhong

References

External links
Official website

National Institutes of Health